Vallée d’Aoste Jambon de Bosses is a spicy cured ham product from Saint-Rhémy-en-Bosses in the Aosta Valley in Italy, one of the region's specialties. It was awarded European Union protected designation of origin (PDO) status.

See also
 List of hams

References

External links
 Vallée d’Aoste Jambon de Bosses, official Aosta Valley tourism board website (multilingual)

Italian cuisine
Salumi
Italian products with protected designation of origin
Ham
Cuisine of Aosta Valley